In Greek mythology, Aesymnus or Aisymnos (Ancient Greek: Αἴσυμνόν) was a Greek warrior in the Trojan War.

Mythology 
Aesymnus was slain by Hector just before the Trojans attack the Greek ship's camp in the tenth year of the battle."Who then was first to be slain, and who last by Hector, Priam's son, when Zeus vouchsafed him glory? Asaeus first, and Autonous, and Opites and Dolops, son of Clytius, and Opheltius, and Agelaus, and Aesymnus, and Orus, and Hipponous, staunch in fight. These leaders of the Danaans he slew and thereafter fell upon the multitude, and even as when the West Wind driveth the clouds of the white South Wind, smiting them with a violent squall, and many a swollen wave rolleth onward, and on high the spray is scattered beneath the blast of the wandering wind; even so many heads of the host were laid low by Hector."

Legacy 
Aesymnus' name inspired 231666 Aisymnos, a Jupiter trojan.

Notes

References 
 Homer, The Iliad with an English Translation by A.T. Murray, Ph.D. in two volumes. Cambridge, MA., Harvard University Press; London, William Heinemann, Ltd. 1924. . Online version at the Perseus Digital Library.
 Homer, Homeri Opera in five volumes. Oxford, Oxford University Press. 1920. . Greek text available at the Perseus Digital Library.

Achaeans (Homer)